Void safety (also known as null safety) is a guarantee within an object-oriented programming language that no object references will have null or void values.

In object-oriented languages, access to objects is achieved through references (or, equivalently, pointers). A typical call is of the form:

 x.f(a, ...)

where f denotes an operation and x denotes a reference to some object. At execution time, however, a reference can be void (or null). In such cases, the call above will be a void call, leading to a run-time exception, often resulting in abnormal termination of the program.

Void safety is a static (compile-time) guarantee that a void call will never arise.

History
In a 2009 talk, Tony Hoare traced the invention of the null pointer to his design of the ALGOL W language and called it a "mistake":

Bertrand Meyer introduced the term "void safety".

In programming languages
An early attempt to guarantee void safety was the design of the Self programming language.

The Eiffel language is void-safe according to its ISO-ECMA standard; the void-safety mechanism is implemented in EiffelStudio starting with version 6.1 and using a modern syntax starting with version 6.4.

The Spec# language, a research language from Microsoft Research, has a notion of "non-nullable type" addressing void safety.
The F# language, a functional-first language from Microsoft Research running on .NET framework, is void-safe except when interoperating with other .NET languages.

Null safety based in union types

Since 2011 several languages support union types and intersection types, which can be used to detect possible null pointers at compiling time, using a special class Null of which the value null is its unique instance.

The null safety based in types appeared first in the Ceylon, followed soon by TypeScript.

The C# language implements compile-time null safety check since version 8. However, to stay compatible with anterior versions of the language, the feature is opt-in on a per project or per file basis.

The Google's Dart language implements it since its version 2.0, in August 2018

Other languages that use null-safe types by default include JetBrains' Kotlin, Rust, and Apple's Swift.

See also
Nullable type
Option type
Safe navigation operator

References

Object-oriented programming